Schrempf is a German surname. Notable people with the surname include:

Christoph Schrempf (1860–1944), German evangelical theologian and philosopher
Detlef Schrempf (born 1963), German basketball player
Friedrich Schrempf (1858–1912), editor and member of the German Reichstag
 (born 1986), Austrian biathlete and cross-country skier

German-language surnames